Ammaiyappan is a village in the Tiruvarur taluk of Tiruvarur district, Tamil Nadu, India.

Demographics 

As per the 2001 census, Ammaiyappan  had a total population of 4616 with 2233 males and 2383 females. The sex ratio was 1.067. The literacy rate was 80.44.

References 

 

Villages in Tiruvarur district
Villages in Kudavasal Taluk